Halldorson is a surname. Notable people with the surname include:

Christian Halldorson (1891–1956), Canadian politician
Dan Halldorson (born 1952), Canadian golfer
Laura Halldorson (born 1963), American ice hockey player and coach
Salome Halldorson (1887–1970), Canadian politician

See also
Halldórsson, Icelandic patronymic name